Pu'u Kōnāhuanui consists of two mountain peaks located in Honolulu County, Hawaii. It is the highest point in the Koʻolau Mountains and second highest point on the island of Oahu.

The Hawaiian word "Kōnāhuanui" roughly translates to "large testicles" in English. This alludes to a legend that states the mountain originated from the testicles of a giant, who threw them at a woman trying to escape from him.

References

Landforms of Oahu
Mountains of Hawaii